P. atlantica  may refer to:
 Pedicypraedia atlantica, a sea snail species
 Phenacolimax atlantica, an air-breathing land snail species endemic to Portugal
 Phoenix atlantica, the Cape Verde palm, a palm species in the genus Phoenix endemic to the Cape Verde Islands
 Phronima atlantica, a small translucent deep sea amphipod crustacean species
 Pistacia atlantica, the Mt. Atlas mastic tree, a tree species
 Polysiphonia atlantica a small red marine alga

See also
 Atlantica